The recurrent branch of the median nerve is the branch of the median nerve which supplies the thenar muscles. It is also occasionally referred to as the thenar branch of the median nerve, or the thenar muscular branch of the median nerve.

Structure 
An earlier branch of the median nerve also supplies the lumbricals 1 & 2. All other intrinsic muscles of the hand receive their motor innervation from branches of the ulnar nerve. It usually passes distal to the transverse carpal ligament. It ends in the opponens pollicis.

Function 
In the thenar eminence, the recurrent branch of the median nerve provides motor innervation to: 
 opponens pollicis muscle.
 abductor pollicis brevis muscle.
 the superficial part of flexor pollicis brevis muscle.

Clinical significance 
The recurrent branch of the median nerve may be affected in carpal tunnel syndrome, or from its own separate peripheral neuropathies.

Surgery 
The recurrent branch of the median nerve is also colloquially called the "Million Dollar Nerve", because injury to this nerve during carpal tunnel surgery can lead to a million dollar lawsuit. Injury to this nerve can lead to loss of function of the thumb. Such injury can happen if the flexor retinaculum is transected too radially. The possibility of injury to this nerve is even greater when it runs through the ligament without any curling at the distal part of the ligament.

References

External links
 

Nerves of the upper limb